Sir Simon Henry Ward Hughes (born 17 May 1951) is a former British politician. He is now the Chancellor of London South Bank University, an External Adviser to The Open University, and UK Strategic Adviser to Talgo. Hughes was Deputy Leader of the Liberal Democrats from 2010 to 2014, and from 2013 until 2015 was Minister of State at the Ministry of Justice. He was the Member of Parliament (MP) for the constituency of Bermondsey and Old Southwark (and its predecessors) from 1983 until 2015. He declined a position in the House of Lords in 2015.

Until 2008, he was President of the Liberal Democrats (the party president chairs the Federal Executive board of the party, is the senior elected party official and also represents the party at official functions). Hughes has twice run unsuccessfully for the leadership of the party and was its unsuccessful candidate for Mayor of London in the 2004 election.

He was appointed as a Privy Councillor on 15 December 2010. In December 2013 Hughes was appointed as a Minister of State for Justice and Civil Liberties, and announced he would stand down as Deputy Leader upon the election of a successor. Hughes is also the Chair of the Local Governing Body of Bacon's College, Rotherhithe, and Chair of the London Bubble Theatre Company, Senior Independent Director of the London Football Association and a trustee of the Millwall Community Trust and the Rose Theatre Trust.

Early life and education 
Hughes was born on 17 May 1951 to James Henry Annesley Hughes and his wife, Sylvia (née Ward). He was privately educated at The Cathedral School, Llandaff, where he was Dean's Scholar and Head Boy in 1964; Christ College, Brecon; Selwyn College, Cambridge, where he graduated in Law; and the College of Europe in Bruges, where he earned a postgraduate Certificate of Advanced European Studies (equivalent to a master's degree). Hughes was called to the bar at the Inner Temple in 1974. He moved to Bermondsey in 1977.

Bermondsey
Hughes was first elected to Parliament in the Bermondsey by-election of 24 February 1983, in which he defeated Labour candidate and gay rights campaigner Peter Tatchell. The by-election was described by Gay News as "the dirtiest and most notorious by-election in British political history" because of the slurs against Tatchell's character by various opposing campaigners. The Liberal campaign leaflet described the sixteen-candidate election as "a straight choice" between Simon Hughes and the Labour candidate. Hughes won the seat with 57.7% of the vote.

Hughes apologised for the campaign in 2006, during the same few days revealing his own homosexual experiences, and confirming that he is bisexual after being outed by The Sun newspaper. He told the BBC's Newsnight programme: "I hope that there will never be that sort of campaign again. I have never been comfortable about the whole of that campaign, as Peter knows, and I said that to him in the past ... Where there were things that were inappropriate or wrong, I apologise for that."

In an apparent attempt to bring the controversy over the 1983 Bermondsey byelection to a close, Peter Tatchell formally endorsed Simon Hughes for Liberal Democrat leader on 25 January 2006, saying: "Simon Hughes is the best of the Lib Dem leadership candidates. If I was a party member, he'd get my vote. I want to see a stronger lead on social justice and green issues. Despite his recent drift to the centre, Simon is the contender most likely to move the Liberal Democrats in a progressive direction." In the same statement, Tatchell added: "Since his election, Simon has redeemed himself by voting for gay equality. That's all that matters now. He should be judged on his policies, not his private life."

However, Hughes subsequently chose to abstain from the final vote for gay marriage. Earlier in the debates he voted for the second reading, but also backed what was seen as a "wrecking amendment" and expressed the view that marriage was "traditionally ordained by God as between one man and one woman" and that civil marriage and faith-based marriage should be separated in law.

At the 1983 general election, held a matter of months after the by-election victory, the constituency had been redrawn as Southwark and Bermondsey. By the 1997 election it had been redrawn again, as North Southwark and Bermondsey, with a further change prior to the 2010 election at which the seat was titled Bermondsey and Old Southwark.

The election result in North Southwark and Bermondsey in the 2005 general election was a worse one for Hughes than those he had achieved in previous battles. He held the seat, but the Labour Party saw a 5.9% swing in its favour—the biggest swing to Labour anywhere in the UK. When interviewed on election night television by Jeremy Paxman, Hughes suggested that the fall in his vote might reflect the unpopularity of Southwark Council, which had been controlled by the Liberal Democrats since 2002. In 2010 Hughes won a record majority of 8,530.

Hughes lost the seat in 2015 to Labour's Neil Coyle, after being an MP for 32 years. He stood again at the 2017 general election in his former seat, gaining 18,189 votes, but was defeated for the second time by Coyle who polled 31,161 votes, a majority of 12,972. Hughes stood down as a parliamentary candidate in September 2018.

Political and parliamentary career
Hughes first joined the Liberal Party in 1971, when he signed up to Cambridge University Liberal Club as a student. As part of the SDP–Liberal Alliance, he was spokesman for the environment from 1983 to 1988. Along with the majority of Liberals, he joined the newly founded Liberal Democrats in 1988, acting as spokesman for education until 1992, then the environment again until 1994, then health until 1997, and then home affairs until 2003. He was the Liberal Democrat candidate in the 2004 Mayor of London elections and came in third with 15.22% of the first preference vote.

In 1986, Hughes—along with two other MPs, Archy Kirkwood and Michael Meadowcroft, and the NLYL and other parts of the party—produced Across the Divide: Liberal Values on Defence and Disarmament. This was the rally call that defeated the party leadership in the debate over the issue of an independent nuclear deterrent. Many believe it was Hughes' speech that won the day for the rebels by 23 votes.

Among other party offices, Hughes was Vice-President of the Liberal Democrat Christian Forum. He has also stated that "the present constitutional arrangements for making English decisions are unacceptable and need to be changed."
He was a member of the centre-left Beveridge Group within the Liberal Democrats.

He was investigated by the Parliamentary Commissioner for Standards for failing to declare a £10,000 donation from a scrap metals company, Southwark Metals, to his local party. There was no suggestion that Mr Hughes benefited personally from the donation. The commissioner found that none of the breaches of the rules was intentional and that there was no attempt to conceal any donations. Simon Hughes apologised to parliament for his mistakes.

In December 2013, Hughes was appointed as a Minister of State for Justice, following the resignation of Lord McNally who had become Chair of the Youth Justice Board. Hughes announced he would stand down as Deputy Leader of the Liberal Democrats once a successor was elected, following a decision that state the Deputy Leader should not hold any office in the coalition government.

Getting refugee status for Mehdi Kazemi
Hughes was an important figure in the fight to grant a young gay man, Mehdi Kazemi, asylum so he would not be deported to his homeland of Iran, which had executed his boyfriend, on the basis that it almost certainly would have executed him. Kazemi thanked Hughes in a letter to people across the world who fought to prevent deportation: "I would like to say thank you to my local MP, Mr Simon Hughes, and his team who gave me the chance to live and made a miracle happen when he heard that my life was in serious danger and asked the Home Office to suspend my deportation in December 2006. I would not be here if it hadn’t been for his intervention. He was here for me then and he was here for me again when I was eventually sent back to the UK in April this year. I do not know if I would have been granted my refugee status without him."

Leadership election, 2006

On 12 January 2006, Hughes announced his candidature in the leadership election triggered by the resignation of Charles Kennedy. He had initially delayed any announcement while carrying out Presidential responsibilities in drawing up the timetable for the contest. Speaking to reporters he said: "What I have to offer is my ambition, enthusiasm and passion. ... What I have to offer is my experience over many years in Parliament and campaigning around the country to motivate people to join us."

After revelation about Hughes' long-rumoured sexuality, which came four days after Mark Oaten resigned from the Liberal Democrat front bench and gave up on the leadership race, Peter Tatchell confirmed his view that, despite the 1983 Bermondsey incidents: "I hope Simon is elected as party leader because of all the contenders he is the most progressive on human rights, social justice and environmental issues."

Hughes apologised after his outing by The Sun, saying "I gave a reply that wasn't untrue but was clearly misleading and I apologise." He also admitted during the Question Time leadership candidate debate on BBC One on 9 February that he hadn't handled the matter very well.

Hughes campaigned under a slogan of "Freedom, fairness and sustainability". His manifesto was also released in PDF format, and was available from his campaign website. Of the three candidates in the contest, he was generally considered the most left wing. For example, he said in his manifesto that "Britain has become less, not more fair, in recent years. Few people would have expected the Tories to deliver a fair society. But more might have hoped that a Labour government would deliver fairness. The reality has been bitterly disappointing. Inequalities in health have increased under Labour, not decreased."

The campaign was marked by a series of hustings around the UK. One was held in Edinburgh where Hughes stressed his human rights and Green friendly background; another in Manchester. The final hustings was held in London on 23 February 2006.

He said he was proud to have played some part in the success of the Lib Dems across the country.

In the final result, Hughes came third in the ballot of party members with 12,081 votes, behind Campbell and Huhne. In the autumn of 2007, as speculation over Menzies Campbell's leadership continued, Simon Hughes publicly criticised him in a GMTV interview, stating that he had to do better.

Deputy leadership election, 2010

The 2010 general election, held on 6 May 2010, was the first since 1974 to result in a hung parliament—with the Conservative Party having the most votes and seats, but no party having an overall majority. On 11 May 2010, Labour Party leader and prime minister Gordon Brown announced his resignation, which allowed  David Cameron to become Prime Minister, after forming a coalition with the Liberal Democrats.

Among the Liberal Democrat MPs to be given roles in the cabinet was the deputy party leader Vince Cable, who became Business Secretary and resigned from his role as deputy party leader. Cable's resignation as deputy leader caused a deputy leadership election, with Hughes defeating Tim Farron by 38 votes to 18.

Personal life
Outside politics, Hughes is a noted supporter of Millwall Football Club, which whilst considered to be in South Bermondsey is actually based just outside his constituency in Lewisham Deptford.

Hughes has never married, although in an interview with The Daily Telegraph in 2006, he said he had been turned down by "several women". He denied persistent rumours about his sexuality, when asked if he was gay, saying "The answer is no, as it happens, but if it were the case, which it isn't, I hope that it would not be an issue." Two days later, in an interview with The Independent he again denied being gay, and later in an interview with The Guardian he repeated the denial.

However, on 26 January 2006, after The Sun newspaper told him that they had proof that he had used a gay chat service known as 'Man Talk', Hughes admitted that in the past he had had relationships with both women and men. 

Referring to his change from previous denials about his sexuality and recent Liberal Democrat difficulties he said, "I hope that any colleague in any party at any time who might not have been entirely honest for good reason or who may have made a mistake is accepted back at the right time", and also "I gave a reply that wasn't untrue but was clearly misleading. I apologise." He confirmed to PinkNews that he is bisexual.

In an interview broadcast on the same day on BBC Radio 5 Live, he was asked if he considered quitting the race for leadership of his party, he replied: "Of course. I considered also whether I should stand in the first place. It is a balance I have always had to take."

He once appeared on Top of the Pops.

Honours
On 13 May 2010 Hughes was sworn in as a member of Her Majesty's Most Honourable Privy Council. This gave him the Honorific Prefix "The Right Honourable" for Life. In the 2015 Queen's Birthday Honours List, Hughes was knighted "for public and political service". This allowed him to be known as "Sir Simon Hughes".

See also

 Liberal Democrat frontbench team

References

External links 
 Simon Hughes MP  official constituency website
 Profile at the Liberal Democrats

 Profile: Simon Hughes BBC News, 3 February 2006

|-

|-

|-

|-

|-

1951 births
Alumni of Selwyn College, Cambridge
Bisexual men
Bisexual politicians
College of Europe alumni
English Anglicans
LGBT Anglicans
LGBT members of the Parliament of the United Kingdom
English LGBT politicians
Liberal Democrats (UK) MPs for English constituencies
Liberal Party (UK) MPs for English constituencies
Living people
Members of the Privy Council of the United Kingdom
People educated at Christ College, Brecon
People educated at The Cathedral School, Llandaff
People from Cheshire
Politics of the London Borough of Southwark
Presidents of the Liberal Democrats (UK)
UK MPs 1979–1983
UK MPs 1983–1987
UK MPs 1987–1992
UK MPs 1992–1997
UK MPs 1997–2001
UK MPs 2001–2005
UK MPs 2005–2010
UK MPs 2010–2015
Knights Bachelor
Politicians awarded knighthoods